Lilian Nicholas (born 24 November 1909, date of death unknown) was an international lawn and indoor bowls competitor for Wales.

Bowls career
In 1977 she won the bronze medal in the pairs at the 1977 World Outdoor Bowls Championship in Worthing with Janet Ackland and a silver medal in the team event (Taylor Trophy).

Nicholas was seven times Welsh singles champion in 1963, 1964, 1967, 1970, 1971, 1978 & 1982 at the Welsh National Bowls Championships. and twice an indoor Welsh triples champion. She was also the inaugural winner of the singles at the British Isles Bowls Championships in 1972.

References

1909 births
Year of death missing
Welsh female bowls players